Halfdan Haraldsson or Halfdan the Black (not to be confused with his grandfather and namesake) was a son of Harald I of Norway by his first wife, Åsa, the daughter of Jarl Håkon Grjotgardsson of Lade. He was made sub-king of the Trondelag by his father, along with his brother Halfdan the White. According to Heimskringla, Halfdan the Black was poisoned, possibly at the behest of his sister in law Gunnhild, Mother of Kings.

References
 
 
 
 

Year of birth missing
Year of death missing
Norwegian petty kings
Fairhair dynasty
10th-century Norwegian nobility